The Enchantress was a 19th-century racing yacht, winner of several national and international Cups including the Royal Yacht Squadron's  regatta around the Le Havre to Southampton, and the New York Yacht Club's  regatta from Owl's Head Point to Sandy Hook Lightship. She was designed by Robert Fish for George L. Lorillard.

Enchantress's origins 

In 1871, the Enchantress was modeled, in New York, by Captain Robert Fish (1812-1883) for George L. Lorillard. She has had several owners (see subsequent owners below). The Enchantress was built by shipbuilder Samuel H. Pine of Greenpoint, Brooklyn. She was  berthed at the New York Yacht Club and sailed by Captain Reuben King. Fish designed hundreds of vessels of all sizes, including the Truant, Challenge, Eva, and the Meteor. Her model resides at the New York Yacht Club.

Captain
The Enchantress was captained by Reuben King, the first mate, William Dand, and the Sandy Hook Pilot, Peter W. Roff. There were 18 crew members. Joseph F. Loubat, of the New York Yacht Club, wrote about the Enchantress and Robert Fish in a yachting memoir, A Yachtsman’s Scrap Book, or the Ups and Downs of Yacht Racing.

Cape May challenge cup ocean race 

On October 9, 1873, the Enchantress was one of the boats that participated in the New York Yacht Club ocean  regatta, which was a yacht race from Owl's Head Point around to Cape May Lighthouse in New Jersey, and back to the Sandy hook Lightship. Both yachts and pilot boats were entered in the race. The Enchantress was the winning yacht for the Bennett Cup, valued at $1,000. The pilot-boat Thomas S. Negus won second place and James W. Elwell which came in third place.

The name "Bennett Cup" came from  James Gordon Bennett who was the commodore of the New York Yacht Club. At this time, Joseph F. Loubat was the owner, Captain Robert Fish (designer), Reuben King (master), and Sandy Hook Pilot Peter W. Roff were on board the Enchantress in the race.

International English yacht race 

Anchored off Stapleton, Staten Island, the Enchantress was overhauled with new rigging, spars and sails to prepare her for the trip across the Atlantic to England. On December 1, 1873, the Enchantress arrived at Cowes, England from New York. On February 15, 1874, Fish left on the steamer Herman to Cowes where he took command of the Enchantress. On July 25, 1874, the Enchantress won the Royal Yacht Squadron's  regatta around the Le Havre to Southampton and brought home the Cape May Cup. The Enchantress was commanded by Captain Poland.

Prince of Wales's challenge cup yacht race 

On August 8, 1874, the Enchantress entered the Prince of Wales  cup race from Cowes around the Shambles Lightship, and back around the Nab, passing the Isle of Wight to Cowes. The race was for American and English schooners and yawls of 100 tons or more. The Enchantress was listed as 320 tons and the owner was Joseph F. Loubat. After a series of mishaps, the Enchantress returned to Cowes.

Other races 

 Loubat Ocean Cup Race - October, 1876: from Owl's Head Point back to the Sandy hook Lightship
 Cup May Race - September, 1877: to Cape May Lighthouse and return to Sandy Hook

Out of service

On February 22, 1922, the yacht Enchantress was not commissioned during the financial year 1922-23 and was decommissioned in Portsmouth Harbour.

Subsequent owners

 In 1871, Loubat sold the Enchantress to George L. Lorillard. 
 In 1873, Loubat bought back the Enchantress from George L. Lorillard. 
 On October 6, 1877, Loubat sold the Enchantress to Major Owen Williams. 
 In 1879, the Enchantress was sold in England.

See also
 List of large sailing yachts

References

External links 
 New York Yacht Club
 Royal Yacht Squadron

1871 ships
Individual sailing vessels
Schooners of the United States
Yachts of New York Yacht Club members